Hussain Karimi (born 15 December 1983) is a Bahraini racing driver currently competing in the Bahrain International Circuit 2000cc Challenge. Having previously competed in the TCR International Series.

Racing career
Karimi began his career in 2010 in the Bahrain International Circuit 2000cc Challenge, he still races there and is currently 3rd the 2016 championship standings. He previously finished runner-up in the championship in 2014 and 2015, taking several victories those years.

In March 2016 it was announced that he would race in the TCR International Series at his home event at the Bahrain International Circuit, driving a SEAT León Cup Racer for Bas Koeten Racing.

Racing record

Complete TCR International Series results
(key) (Races in bold indicate pole position) (Races in italics indicate fastest lap)

References

External links
 

1983 births
Living people
TCR International Series drivers
Bahraini racing drivers
Sportspeople from Manama